is a Japanese professional footballer who plays as a midfielder for Nagoya Grampus.

Career statistics
Last update: 9 July 2022.

References

External links

1995 births
Living people
Japanese footballers
Association football midfielders
Kyoto Sanga FC players
Avispa Fukuoka players
Nagoya Grampus players
J1 League players
J2 League players